East Franklin Township is a township in Armstrong County, Pennsylvania, United States. The population was 3,821 at the 2020 census, a decrease from the figure of 4,082 tabulated in 2010.

History
The Allegheny River Lock and Dam No. 7 was listed on the National Register of Historic Places in 2000. East Franklin Township appears in the 1876 Atlas of Armstrong County, Pennsylvania.

Geography
The township is located in west-central Armstrong County, on the west side of the Allegheny River. It surrounds the boroughs of West Kittanning and Applewold. Unincorporated communities in the township include West Hills, Walkchalk, Furnace Run, Tarrtown, Bridgeburg, Adrian, and Cowansville.

Demographics

As of the census of 2000, there were 3,900 people, 1,546 households, and 1,167 families residing in the township.  The population density was 126.4 people per square mile (48.8/km).  There were 1,656 housing units at an average density of 53.7/sq mi (20.7/km).  The racial makeup of the township was 98.87% White, 0.10% African American, 0.21% Native American, 0.36% Asian, 0.03% Pacific Islander, 0.03% from other races, and 0.41% from two or more races. Hispanic or Latino of any race were 0.44% of the population.

There were 1,546 households, out of which 28.9% had children under the age of 18 living with them, 66.9% were married couples living together, 5.2% had a female householder with no husband present, and 24.5% were non-families. 21.6% of all households were made up of individuals, and 12.2% had someone living alone who was 65 years of age or older.  The average household size was 2.51 and the average family size was 2.93.

The township median age of 43 years was significantly more than the county median age of 40 years. The distribution by age group was 21.9% under the age of 18, 6.1% from 18 to 24, 25.5% from 25 to 44, 28.7% from 45 to 64, and 17.8% who were 65 years of age or older.  The median age was 43 years. For every 100 females, there were 93.4 males.  For every 100 females age 18 and over, there were 92.0 males.

The median income for a household in the township was $37,753, and the median income for a family was $41,797. Males had a median income of $35,391 versus $20,000 for females. The per capita income for the township was $17,787.  About 7.2% of families and 8.2% of the population were below the poverty line, including 14.3% of those under age 18 and 4.8% of those age 65 or over.

Cemeteries
Cowansville Cemetery
Crissman Family Cemetery
Croyle Cemetery
Lawnhaven Cemetery / Lawn Haven Burial Estates
Montgomeryville Baptist Church Cemetery
Myers - Patton Cemetery
Rich Hill United Presbyterian Church Cemetery
West Glade Run Presbyterian Cemetery

References

External links

East Franklin Township official website

Populated places established in 1830
Pittsburgh metropolitan area
Townships in Armstrong County, Pennsylvania
Townships in Pennsylvania
1830 establishments in Pennsylvania